Zhvakino is a rural locality (a village) in Abdullinsky Selsoviet, Mechetlinsky District, Bashkortostan, Russia. The population was 1 as of 2010. There is 1 street.

Geography 
Zhvakino is located 35 km northwest of Bolsheustyikinskoye (the district's administrative centre) by road. Russkaya Tavra is the nearest rural locality.

References 

Rural localities in Mechetlinsky District